Arsikeri  is a village in the southern state of Karnataka, India. It is located in the Harapanahalli taluk of Vijayanagara district  in Karnataka.

Demographics
 India census, Arsikeri had a population of 5705 with 2935 males and 2770 females.
 India census, Arsikeri had a population of 6126 with 3130 males and 2996 females.

See also
 Bellary
 Districts of Karnataka

References

External links
 http://Bellary.nic.in/

Villages in Bellary district